Anodonthyla montana also known as the Mountain Climbing frog is a species of frog in the family Microhylidae. It is endemic to Madagascar. Its natural habitats are subtropical or tropical high-altitude shrubland, subtropical or tropical high-altitude grassland, and rocky areas.

References

Anodonthyla
Endemic frogs of Madagascar
Taxonomy articles created by Polbot
Amphibians described in 1925